Cameron Brimblecombe (born 12 September 1991) is an Australian cricketer. He played in one first-class match for Queensland in 2014.

Cricket career
In 2011 Queensland captain James Hopes spoke positively about Brimblecombe's prospects saying "He's exceptional, he's got a lot of natural talent that enables him to bowl offspin, he's tall, he's got big hands, and he's going to be a star I think." He made his debut for Queensland in December 2014 and was notably dismissed by Sean Abbott as part of a hattrick.

As of 2020 Brimblecombe was playing for Suns Darling Downs in the Bulls Masters Country Challenge competition.

See also
 List of Queensland first-class cricketers

References

External links
 

1991 births
Living people
Australian cricketers
Queensland cricketers
Cricketers from Queensland